Fintan Coogan (13 April 1910 – 4 November 1984) was an Irish Fine Gael politician. A blacksmith before entering politics, he was a Teachta Dála (TD) for over twenty years, and served three times as Mayor of Galway.

Coogan unsuccessfully contested the 1951 general election in the Galway West constituency, but won a seat in Dáil Éireann at the 1954 general election. He was re-elected five times until his defeat at the 1977 general election by his party colleague John Mannion.

A long-serving member of both Galway County Council and Galway City Council, Coogan served as mayor of Galway city from 1961 to 1962, 1969 to 1970 and 1974 to 1975. He was a member of the Western Health Board from 1979 until his death, when he was succeeded on the board by his son Fintan Coogan Jnr, who was then both a TD and a county councillor, and also served several terms as Mayor of Galway.

See also
Families in the Oireachtas

References

Sources
Henry, William (2002). Role of Honour: The Mayors of Galway City 1485-2001. Galway: Galway City Council.  

1910 births
1984 deaths
Fine Gael TDs
Members of the 15th Dáil
Members of the 16th Dáil
Members of the 17th Dáil
Members of the 18th Dáil
Members of the 19th Dáil
Members of the 20th Dáil
Mayors of Galway
Politicians from County Galway